Local elections in Enugu State were held on 23 February 2022. The Peoples Democratic Party won control of all 17 councils in the state.

References

See also 

Enugu State local elections
February 2022 events in Africa
2022 local elections in Nigeria